Tosselilla Summer Park or Tosselilla Amusement Park, previously Tomelilla Summer Park, is an amusement park outside Tomelilla, Sweden. it was opened on 26 May 1984. There are 86 activities at Tosselilla. Including a Zipline, Swimming Pools, Roller coasters, water coasters, canoes and bumper cars.

References 

Amusement parks in Sweden
Scania
Buildings and structures in Skåne County
Tourist attractions in Skåne County
1984 establishments in Sweden
Amusement parks opened in 1984